Cristofano is a given name. Notable people with the name include:

Cristofano Allori (1577–1621), Italian portrait painter of the late Florentine Mannerist school
Cristofano Berardi (18th century), an Italian engraver
Cristofano Bertelli (active c. 1525), Italian engraver
Cristofano dell'Altissimo (c. 1525 – 1605), Italian painter in Florence
Cristofano Gherardi (1508–1556), Italian painter of the late-Renaissance or Mannerist period, active mainly in Florence and Tuscany
Cristofano Malvezzi (1547–1599), Italian organist and composer of the late Renaissance
Cristofano Robetta (1462–1535), Italian artist, goldsmith, and engraver
Giovanni Cristofano Amaduzzi (1740–1792), distinguished Italian philologist